Group B of the 2008 Fed Cup Asia/Oceania Zone Group II was one of two pools in the Asia/Oceania Zone Group II of the 2008 Fed Cup. Four teams competed in a round robin competition, with the teams proceeding to their respective sections of the play-offs: the top team played for advancement to the 2009 Group I.

Kazakhstan vs. Turkmenistan

Singapore vs. Sri Lanka

Kazakhstan vs. Sri Lanka

Singapore vs. Turkmenistan

Kazakhstan vs. Singapore

Turkmenistan vs. Sri Lanka

See also
Fed Cup structure

References

External links
 Fed Cup website

2008 Fed Cup Asia/Oceania Zone